The Alesani River is a river in the Haute-Corse department in the island of Corsica, France.

Location

It rises to the southeast of the  Monte Muffraje.
In the upper part of its course it is called the Busso.
The river flows northeast to Piobetta, then southeast to the coast.
To the north of Chiatra the river is dammed to form the Réservoir d'Alesani.

Communes

The valley of the Alésani is part of the Castagniccia.
The river crosses the communes of Chiatra, Novale, Ortale, Perelli, Piazzali, Pietra-di-Verde, Pietricaggio, Piobetta, Sant'Andréa-di-Cotone, San-Giuliano, Tarrano and Valle-d'Alesani.

Management

The Comité de bassin de Corse was created by the Corsican law of 22 January 2002.
It defines the main principles of managing water resources and protecting the natural aquatic environment of Corsica.
The Agence de l'eau Rhône-Méditerranée et Corse serves the committee and the Corsican territorial collectivity.

Tributaries

The following streams (Ruisseaux) are tributaries of the Alesani:

Spiscia (5 km) 
Filetta (3 km) 
Panu a l'Acqua (1 km) 
Sancte Marine (1 km) 
Mighiarette (1 km) 
Salge (1 km) 
Tighiccio (1 km) 
Tulleria (5 km) 
Aja Vecchia (1 km) 
Etimone (1 km) 
Zampinajo (1 km) 
Pagliaje (1 km) 
Vignale (1 km) 
Fornelli (1 km) 
Cipatorno (5 km) 
Rosso (4 km) 
Teghio (2 km) 
Fontanelle (1 km) 
Picchio (4 km) 
Lavandaja (3 km) 
Cemitojo (2 km) 
Suliciani (3 km) 
Valle Botacci (3 km) 
Vigna (2 km) 
Rione (2 km) 
Piobbo (2 km) 
Castagneto (2 km) 
Brisco (2 km) 
Lavatojo (2 km) 
Solajolo (2 km) 
Pozzolo (2 km) 
Delle Fighe (1 km) 
Tanelle (1 km) 
Nebbio (1 km) 
Calcinajo (1 km) 
Montagnane (1 km)

Notes

Sources

Rivers of Haute-Corse
Rivers of France
Coastal basins of the Tyrrhenian Sea in Corsica